Cacophony is the second studio album by English anarcho-punk band Rudimentary Peni. It was released 17 November 1988 on their own label, Outer Himalayan Records.

Track listing 

 "Nightgaunts"
 "The Horrors in the Museum"
 "The Only Child"
 "Architectonic and Dominant"
 "The Evil Clergyman"
 "Brown Jenkin"
 "Crazed Couplet"
 "Sarcophagus"
 "Lovecraft Baby"
 "Dream City"
 "C12 H22 011"
 "Zenophobia"
 "Sunset for the Lords of Venus"
 "Beyond the Tanarian Hills"
 "Imps of the Perverse"
 "The Dead Loved"
 "Periwig Power"
 "Kappa Alpha Tau"
 "American Anglophile in the World Turned Upside-Down"
 "Memento Mori"
 "Better Not Born"
 "Arkham Hearse"
 "The Old Man Is Not So Terribly Misanthropic"
 "Gentlemen Prefer Blood"
 "Sonia"
 "The Day the Universe Ceased (March 15, 1937)"
 "The Crime of the Century"
 "Musick in Diabola"
 "Shard"
 "Black on Gold"

Personnel 

 Nick Blinko – guitar, vocals, cover artwork
 Grant Brand – bass guitar
 Jon Greville – drums

References

External links 

 

1987 albums
Cthulhu Mythos music